Ruiven is a former municipality in the Dutch province of South Holland. It was located about 4 km southeast of the city of Delft.

Ruiven was a separate municipality between 1817 and 1846, when it became part of Pijnacker.

References

Former municipalities of South Holland
Pijnacker-Nootdorp